Ellie Leek (born 21 January 1995) is a Welsh professional footballer who plays as a midfielder for Blackburn Rovers.

Club career 
Leek started her career at Bristol City Women's, however only ever featured as a substitute after coming through the centre of excellence as a teenager.

Ellie played for four years in the United States playing for Auburn University, before taking the trip to French side Le Havre AC who play their games in the Division 2 Féminine.

She then returned to England as Leek featured for Charlton Athletic W.F.C before joining Lewes L.F.C in 2019.

Ellie Leek signed for Blackburn Rovers L.F.C in 2021 after leaving Lewes L.F.C at the end of the FA Women's Championship 20/21 season.

International career 
Ellie Leek featured for both the under 17's and the under 19's at international level for Wales Women's at the UEFA Women's Championships.

She is also eligible to feature for England Women's National Football Team.

Personal life 
Ellie Leek is currently in a relationship with Manchester United striker, Martha Thomas who has been a big supporter of the LGBTQ+ community and Stonewall's Rainbow Laces Campaign.

References 

Welsh women's footballers
1995 births
Living people
Blackburn Rovers L.F.C. players
Bristol City W.F.C. players
Charlton Athletic W.F.C. players
Lewes F.C. Women players
Women's association football midfielders